Eauripik Island is a coral atoll of three islands in the western Caroline Islands in the Pacific Ocean, and forms a legislative district in Yap State in the Federated States of Micronesia. 
With light southwest winds, there are usually breakers on both sides of the atoll. All of the islets are covered with coconut palms. There used to be five islets, but two were washed away in the late 1970s by typhoon waves.

The population of Eauripik Island was 113 in 2000.  Many islanders usually reside on the Yap mainland as temporary laborers.

As with all of the Caroline Islands, sovereignty passed to the Empire of Germany in 1899. The island came under the control of the Empire of Japan after World War I, and was subsequently administered under the South Seas Mandate. Following World War II, the island came under the control of the United States and was administered as part of the Trust Territory of the Pacific Islands from 1947, and became part of the Federated States of Micronesia from 1979.

References
 Columbia Gazetteer of the World. Vol. 1, p. 900

External links

Islands of Yap
Municipalities of Yap
Atolls of the Federated States of Micronesia